Anne Lamott (born April 10, 1954) is an American novelist and non-fiction writer.

She is also a progressive political activist, public speaker, and writing teacher. Lamott is based in Marin County, California. Her nonfiction works are largely autobiographical. Lamott's writings, marked by their self-deprecating humor and openness, cover such subjects as alcoholism, single-motherhood, depression, and Christianity.

Life and career
Lamott was born in San Francisco, and is a graduate of Drew School. She was a student at Goucher College for two years where she wrote for the newspaper. Her father, Kenneth Lamott, was also a writer. Her first published novel Hard Laughter was written for him after his diagnosis of brain cancer. She has one son, Sam, who was born in August 1989 and a grandson, Jax, born in July 2009.

Lamott's life was documented in Freida Lee Mock's 1999 documentary Bird by Bird with Annie: A Film Portrait of Writer Anne Lamott. Because of the documentary and her following on Facebook and other online networks, she is often called the "People's Author".

Lamott has described why she writes: I try to write the books I would love to come upon, that are honest, concerned with real lives, human hearts, spiritual transformation, families, secrets, wonder, craziness—and that can make me laugh. When I am reading a book like this, I feel rich and profoundly relieved to be in the presence of someone who will share the truth with me, and throw the lights on a little, and I try to write these kinds of books. Books, for me, are medicine. 

Lamott was featured on the second episode of the first season of the show The Midnight Gospel.

Awards and honors
Lamott was awarded a Guggenheim Fellowship in 1985. She was inducted into the California Hall of Fame in 2010.

Personal life
On April 13, 2019, when Lamott was 65, she wed for the first time. She married Neal Allen, 63, a former vice president for marketing at the McKesson Corporation in San Francisco. The couple had met in August 2016. He was a twice-divorced father of four, who had left his job at McKesson to devote himself to writing.

Bibliography

Novels

Non-fiction

 (with Sam Lamott)

Dusk, Night, Dawn: On Revival and Courage. Riverhead Books. 2021. ISBN 978-0593189696.

References

Further reading
Bochynski, Pegge. (2010)  "Anne Lamott" in American Writers: A Collection of Literary Biographies, Supplement XX, Mary Antin to Phillis Wheatley. Ed. Jay Parini. Detroit: Charles Scribner's Sons p131-146.

Vandenburgh, Jane. (2010) Architecture of the Novel: A Writer's Handbook. Anne Lamott (Foreword). Berkeley, CA: Counterpoint

External links

Salon.com: articles by Anne Lamott
Profile – Steven Barclay Agency 
Write TV Public Television Interview (2004)
Minnesota Public Radio Interview (2007)
Interview for Writers on the Record (2007)
Goodreads.com: Author profile: Anne Lamott
TED.com: "12 truths I learned from life and writing", a talk by Anne Lamott (2017)

1954 births
Living people
20th-century American novelists
21st-century American novelists
American Christian pacifists
American Christian writers
American memoirists
American women novelists
People from San Rafael, California
Writers from Baltimore
Writers from San Francisco

American spiritual writers
American women memoirists
20th-century American women writers
21st-century American women writers
Activists from California
Goucher College alumni
Novelists from California
Christians from California
People from Marin County, California
20th-century American non-fiction writers
21st-century American non-fiction writers